Pedro João Luís Bonifácio (born 6 August 1985) is a Portuguese former professional footballer who played as a striker.

Club career
Bonifácio was born in Mafra, Lisbon District. He never played in higher than the third division in his country, representing mainly local club C.D. Mafra where he also acted as captain. in the 2015–16 season he scored a career-best 15 goals to help AC Malveira finish in fourth place in their group (among ten teams), also helping them to the fourth round of the Taça de Portugal whilst being crowned the competition's top scorer.

From summer 2011 until January 2013, Bonifácio competed in the Cypriot Second Division. Subsequently, the 27-year-old signed with FK Vardar from the Macedonian First Football League, making his professional debut on 12 March 2013 in a 6–1 home win against KF Shkëndija where he came on as a 72nd-minute substitute.

Bonifácio returned to Portugal in the 2016 off-season, joining S.C.U. Torreense. In his debut campaign, he netted six times in five games as his side reached the last-16 stage in the domestic cup – this included the only in a 1–0 defeat of Primeira Liga's C.D. Nacional, where he also missed a penalty kick.

Honours
Vardar
Macedonian First Football League: 2012–13

Individual
Taça de Portugal top scorer: 2015–16

References

External links

1985 births
Living people
People from Mafra, Portugal
Sportspeople from Lisbon District
Portuguese footballers
Association football forwards
Segunda Divisão players
C.D. Mafra players
S.C.U. Torreense players
S.U. Sintrense players
Cypriot Second Division players
Doxa Katokopias FC players
Anagennisi Deryneia FC players
Macedonian First Football League players
FK Vardar players
Portuguese expatriate footballers
Expatriate footballers in Cyprus
Expatriate footballers in North Macedonia
Portuguese expatriate sportspeople in Cyprus